The United States Association of Blind Athletes (USABA) is an organization founded in 1976 to increase the number and quality of world-class athletic opportunities for Americans who are blind or visually impaired. USABA has reached over 100,000 blind individuals, and have over 3,000 current members who compete in thirteen sports, most prominently goalball.

Overview 
USABA is a Colorado-based organization whose mission is to empower U.S Americans who are blind or visually impaired and promote a healthy lifestyle by providing opportunities in sports, recreation, and other physical activities. Alongside this, USABA is focused on deconstructing misconceptions about the abilities of people who are blind or visually impaired by educating and inspiring the public through media outreach. USABA is open to any aspiring or current athletes who are blind or visually impaired, coaches, volunteers, or supporters who wish to involve themselves in this community.

History 
USABA was founded by Dr. Charles Buell in 1976. That year, the first Olympiad for the Disabled was hosted in Toronto, Canada, with 27 men and women representing the United States. After this event, a group of national leaders, coaches, and educators began to discuss the importance of an organization specifically focused on promoting and sponsoring competitions for people who are blind or visually impaired. This led to the creation of USABA.

Other original founding members include Arthur Copeland, Judy Whyte, and Lou Moneymaker.

Sports 
USABA works with 13 different sports, which include: Beep Baseball, Bowling, Cycling, Soccer 5-a-side, Goalball, Hockey, Judo, Powerlifting, Rowing, Skiing, Swimming, Track & Field, and Military sports. The most well-known sport is Goalball.

Past events 
USABA has hosted and/or been a part of a variety of events that range from local development camps, national championships, to the Paralympics. USABA has also either hosted or been part of the Can-Am Pacific Games (1987), Youth Championships (1992), The International Games for the Disabled (1984), USABA Summer Games, USABA Regionals, the Olympiad (1976), World Championship Games, Blind Nationals, and USABA National Championships.

USABA's events are all focused on providing tips, strategies, and opportunities to engage in the sports that they offer, or encourage any recreational or competitive fitness. Recently, USABA has partnered with the Anthem Foundation to introduce the National Fitness Challenge. Alongside this, USABA is also promoting National Blind Sports Day, an opportunity to celebrate and showcase the abilities, opportunities, and awareness of sports for the blind or visually impaired.

Awards and recognition 
USABA was awarded the National Federation of the Blind's Dr. Jacob Bolotin Award in  2019, which recognizes individuals or organizations that are a positive force in the blind community.

USABA is also recognized as a High Performance Management Organization with the Paralympics.

Sponsors & Partnered Associations 
USABA has partnered with a multitude of organizations throughout the years, including the Paralymp Team USA, the Anthem Foundation,  Anthem, The Gibney Family Foundation, Vanda Pharmaceutical, Hanson McClain Advisors, Delta Gamma Foundation, Department of Veterans Affairs, and National Industries for the Blind.

Alongside the organizations listed above, USABA has worked with other organizations on specific events with the Veterans Administration, Ski for Light, National Beep-Baseball Association, and International Blind Sports Federation.

Scholarship program 
USABA annually gives out scholarships to students, which include:  
 I C You Foundation Valor Achievement Award - I C You Foundation
 The Arthur E. and Helen Copeland Scholarship

References

External links 
 Website

Blindness organizations in the United States
Parasports organizations in the United States